Abdul Rahman Gurning (born January 15, 1958, in Kisaran, Asahan Regency) is an Indonesian football player and, a former head coach of PSMS Medan and PSPS Pekanbaru.

Careers

Player
He began his career by playing at local clubs in the Asahan, then he was recruited Kamarudin Panggabean to play in the club Mercu Buana. After the club Mercu Buana broke up, he played for the club Medan Jaya and PSMS Medan.

Manager
After retiring as a player, he turned into a football coach with a license A to train a football team. The club has ever trained is Persitara North Jakarta and PSPS Pekanbaru. After success with PSPS he was contracted by PSMS Medan but he soon resigned after a dispute with management. Then he received the proposal Arema Indonesia playing at Indonesia Premier League to be the assistant coach of the Milomir Šešlija, but with the internal problems at the club he resigned. After that he was dealing with Gresik United replace Freddy Muli, before he was sacked by the club because the team did not meet the target.

International careers
He had a career for the Indonesia national football team playing the Asian Games in Seoul, South Korea in 1986. He brought Indonesia became the fourth champion in the arena.

Coaching license
 S3 (1991)
 S2 (1995)
 Lisensi C (1997)
 Lisensi B (1998)
 Lisensi A (2000)

References

1958 births
Living people
Indonesian Muslims
Indonesian footballers
Indonesian football managers
People of Batak descent
PSMS Medan players
Association football midfielders
People from Asahan Regency
Sportspeople from North Sumatra